Hryhorii Mykolaiovych Chapkis (24 February 1930 – 13 June 2021) was a Ukrainian dancer and choreographer. He was laureate of three international competitions. He became a People's Artist of Ukraine in February 2010. Previously he was awarded the title of Meritorious Artist of the Ukrainian SSR (1964).

Professor of the Department of Contemporary Choreography, Faculty of Choreographic Arts, Kyiv National University of Culture and Arts. Professor at the Faculty of Choreographic Arts, Kyiv University of Culture. Professor of the Department of Choreography at the Institute of Arts of Borys Grinchenko Kyiv University.

Chapkis died in Kyiv on 13 June 2021, aged 91, from complications of COVID-19.

References

External links

 

Ukrainian dancers
Ukrainian choreographers
1930 births
2021 deaths
Deaths from the COVID-19 pandemic in Ukraine
Burials at Baikove Cemetery
People from Chișinău
Recipients of the title of People's Artists of Ukraine
Recipients of the Order of Prince Yaroslav the Wise, 5th class